The September Stakes was an American Thoroughbred horse race held annually for the twenty-five years between 1884 and 1908 at Sheepshead Bay Race Track in Sheepshead Bay, New York. A race on dirt, it was open to three-year-old horses of either sex. It was contested at various distances as follows:
1884–1891 : 1 miles
1892–1907 : 1 miles
1908 : 1 miles

Historical notes
First run on September 4, 1884, the race was won by George Lorillard's Louisette. Under Canadian jockey Harry Blaylock the filly led all the way and won with ease.

The Thomas Clay McDowell colt Batten won the 1899 edition by 20 lengths in a canter with a time of 2:21 4/5 that at the time was only a fraction off the track record.

Future Hall of Fame winners
The September Stakes would produce three winners whose racing careers achieved the sport's ultimate acknowledgement of greatness with induction into the U.S. Racing Hall of Fame. The first was Kingston, a part of the 1955 inaugural class, then Beldame in 1956 who was followed by Salvator in 1988.

The end of a race and of a racetrack
The 1908 passage of the Hart–Agnew anti-betting legislation by the New York Legislature under Republican Governor Charles Evans Hughes led to a state-wide shutdown of racing in 1911 and 1912. Sheepshead Bay Race Track officials had no choice but to cancel some races in order to maintain others. As such, the final running of the September Stakes took place on September 8, 1908. A February 21, 1913 ruling by the New York Supreme Court, Appellate Division saw horse racing return in 1913. However, it was too late for the Sheepshead Bay horse racing facility and it never reopened.

Records
Speed record:
 2:19.00 @ 1 miles: Nealon (1906)
 3:03.00 @ 1 miles: Peg Woffington (1888)

Most wins by a jockey:
 2 – Jim McLaughlin (1887, 1889)
 2 – George M. Odom (1900, 1902)
 2 – Frank O'Neill (1903, 1904)
 2 – Willie Simms (1894, 1895)

Most wins by a trainer:
 2 – Matthew Byrnes (1884, 1889)
 2 – William Lakeland (1888, 1898)
 2 – John W. Rogers (1894, 1900)

Most wins by an owner:
 2 – James Ben Ali Haggin (1885, 1889)
 2 – William Lakeland (1888, 1898)

Winners

References

Discontinued horse races in New York City
Open mile category horse races
Sheepshead Bay Race Track
Open middle distance horse races
Open long distance horse races
Recurring sporting events established in 1884
Recurring sporting events disestablished in 1908
1884 establishments in New York (state)
1908 disestablishments in New York (state)